Joyce Anne Noel (November 28, 1932 – February 13, 2019) was an American former beauty queen who served as the First Lady of Rhode Island from 1973 to 1977. Noel, then known by her maiden name of Joyce Sandberg, was crowned Miss Rhode Island in 1953 and Miss Rhode Island USA in 1954, becoming the only woman win both state pageants to date. She later served as Rhode Island's first lady during the tenure of her husband, former Governor Philip Noel.

Biography
Noel was born Joyce Anne Sandberg on November 28, 1932, in Providence, Rhode Island, to Walter and Genevieve (née Healey) Sandberg. She married Philip Noel, a lawyer, on October 20, 1956. The couple had five children - three daughters and two sons.

In 1953, Sandberg won the Miss Rhode Island pageant and participated in the Miss America 1953 pageant later that year. She was next crowned Miss Rhode Island USA in 1954 and was a contestant in the Miss USA 1954 pageant. She remains the only contestant to be crowned both Miss Rhode Island and Miss Rhode Island USA in history. Noel later served as the First Lady of Rhode Island from 1973 until 1977.

Joyce Anne Noel died in Estero, Florida, on February 13, 2019, at the age of 86. She was survived by her husband, Philip Noel, and four of her five children. She and her husband had been resident of both Warwick, Rhode Island, and Estero, Florida, during their later lives.

References

1932 births
2019 deaths
First Ladies and Gentlemen of Rhode Island
American beauty pageant winners
Miss America 1950s delegates
Politicians from Warwick, Rhode Island
People from Estero, Florida
20th-century American people